Type H Tightlock couplers are a variety of Janney coupler, typically used on North American mainline passenger rail cars. They are designed with mechanical features which reduce slack in normal operation and prevent telescoping in derailments, yet remain compatible with other Janney types used by North American freight railroads.

Like all Janney couplers, the Tightlock is "semi-automatic" with the couplers on cars or locomotives automatically locking when cars are pushed together. However, most tightlock couplers are not fully automatic, as workers still need to go between cars to hook up the air lines for the pneumatic brakes, and connect cables for head-end power and other communications. Also, to separate cars, a worker needs to use a lever to move the locking pin that keeps the coupler closed.

In Europe, some operators experimented with making fully automatic tightlock couplers by adding integral pneumatic and electric connectors, but these connections experienced reliability issues. Most operators who experimented with fully automatic tightlock couplers have now switched to the more common fully automatic Scharfenberg coupler.

Janney Type H TightLock coupler standards were established by the Association of American Railroads. Management and development of the standard was transferred to the American Public Transportation Association in 1971 when passenger service was nationalized in the United States from most private railway companies to Amtrak.

AAR Type F 

AAR Type F Vertical InterLock couplers, often mistaken for the Type H Tightlock, are another variety, typical on North American gondola wagons that go through rotary dumpers.

Tightlock use in the United Kingdom
Type H couplers are in widespread use on multiple unit passenger trains in the UK built from the mid 1970s onwards. The previous generation of slam door units fitted with Buckeye/Henricot couplers had required a shunter to get down onto the track and stand between the two units to manually trip the coupler mechanism as well as connect or disconnect the air pipes and electrical jumper leads. In order to reduce staffing costs and cut down station dwell times, British Rail looked to incorporate an automatic coupler mechanism in its new power-door trains. Class 313 units were the first stock to incorporate this. Air-operated Tightlock couplers were chosen, together with underslung electrical connector boxes controlled by a Drum switch, and this allowed drivers to single-handedly attach or split a train without having to leave the cab.

Classes of train equipped included:

 Class 313
 Class 314
 Class 315
 Class 317
 Class 318
 Class 319
 Class 320
 Class 321
 Class 322
 Class 323
 Class 365
 Class 465
 Class 466
 Class 507 
 Class 508

Tightlock was generally a success in the UK, but there were reliability issues and some notable incidents occurred where trains divided in service. The constant couple-uncouple cycles of heavy London commuter services caused the couplers' mechanisms to wear out faster than expected. Connex South Eastern's Networker fleet was particularly susceptible to this and the company blamed its drivers in the media, then changed its coupling instructions to drivers to include a "push-on, pull off" power test and visual inspection to ensure that the knuckles had engaged fully.

By the early 2000s the first batch of Bombardier Electrostar Class 375s had been built with Tightlock couplers for Connex South Central and Connex South Eastern, but it was quickly decided that Dellner couplings would be preferable. All subsequent units were built with these, and their earlier examples were eventually modified.

All multiple-unit trains built for the UK since then have been equipped with Dellner couplings.

Gallery

See also

 Changes to the Janney coupler since 1873
 Draft gear
 Drawbar
 Gangway connection
 Jane's World Railways, lists the coupler(s) used on any railway system
 Length over headstocks
 Multi-function couplers
 Railway coupling
 Railway coupling by country
 Rotary car dumper
 Safety of tank cars
 Slack action
 Three-point hitch

References

External links
 TypeH TightLock Coupler Developed And First Used 1928 In North America On New York Central RR
 TypeH TightLock Coupler Made AAR APT Standard In 1947 For Passenger Stock
 Trains Magazine Article
 Coupler Adapter: Janney To SA3 coupler

Couplers